Erbach an der Donau is a town on the Danube River in Baden-Württemberg, Germany. Located in the Alb-Donau District, Erbach lies between Ulm and Ehingen an der Donau on the southern edge of the Swabian Jura.

History

The oldest known mention of Erbach was in the Konstanz Tithe Book in 1275 as a parish called Irlebach, although findings dating from the Neolithic Age indicate the area around Erbach was settled earlier. Erbach received town privileges on 1 August 2002.

In 1972 the community Ringingen was incorporated into Erbach. In the course of community reforms in 1974 the communities Bach, Dellmensingen, Donaurieden and Ersingen were also incorporated into Erbach.

Politics

The mayor is elected for a term of eight years. The term of office of Paul Roth ended on November 26, 2010. His successor is Achim Gaus, who was elected on October 24, 2010 in the second round and has taken up his duties on 1 January 2011.

Gemeinderat 
The elections on May 25, 2014 led to the following results.

Town twinning
Erbach is twinned with Wolkersdorf im Weinviertel in Austria since 1981 and Thorigny sur Marne in France since 1982.

Infrastructure
Erbach lies on the Bundesstraße 311 between Ulm and Ehingen. It is also located on the Southern Railway (Württemberg) between Ulm and Lindau. Erbach is part of the Danube-Iller Traffic Network, in whose tariff region the South Rail between Ulm and Bad Schussenried belongs to. Erbach has an airfield used by many private pilots from Ulm.

Sights

Erbach is located on the Upper Swabian Baroque Route as well as the Way of St. James. The most prominent sight is the Renaissance Erbach Castle, dating from the early 16th century. The castle was the residence of the Freiherren of Ulm in Erbach. Next to the castle is the Baroque Church of St. Martin from 1767.

Dellmensingen Castle is an early Baroque castle in Dellmensingen.

Personalities
Joseph von Egle (1818–1899), architect, builder of the polytechnical school and the Church of St. Mary in Stuttgart

Joseph Eberle, missionary in Africa
Phillip Roth, honorable town speaker
 Franz Ignaz Albert of Werdenstein (1697–1766), Vicar and Auxiliary Bishop of Freising
 Maximilian Marquard of Ulm-Erbach-Mittelbiberach (1802–1864), landowner and a deputy in the Second Chamber of Württemberg Parliament
 Anton Hafner (1918–1944), officer of the Luftwaffe in World War II
 Wolf-Dietrich Hammann (born 1955), lawyer, assistant secretary in Stuttgart and former chief of police in Baden-Württemberg
 Manfred Albert von Richthofen (1953-2002), German-Brazilian engineer

References

External links
Municipal website 

Alb-Donau-Kreis
Württemberg
Populated places on the Danube